Christopher Knett (born 1 August 1990) is an Austrian professional footballer who played as a goalkeeper for Iranian club Foolad in Iran Pro League.

External links
 
 

1990 births
Living people
Austrian footballers
Association football goalkeepers
2. Liga (Austria) players
Super League Greece players
Persian Gulf Pro League players
SC Austria Lustenau players
FC Wacker Innsbruck (2002) players
Panetolikos F.C. players
Sepahan S.C. footballers
Austrian expatriate footballers
Austrian expatriate sportspeople in Greece
Expatriate footballers in Greece
Expatriate footballers in Iran
Austrian expatriate sportspeople in Iran
Expatriate footballers in Germany
Austrian expatriate sportspeople in Germany